Guns in the Heather is a 1969 Walt Disney adventure film directed by Robert Butler and produced by Ron Miller. It stars Kurt Russell, Glenn Corbett and Alfred Burke.  It was originally broadcast in parts on Walt Disney's Wonderful World of Color in the United States under the title Guns in the Heather, then re-edited for a European theatrical release under the English title, The Secret of Boyne Castle.  It was re-broadcast on American television in 1978 under the title Spy-Busters.  The story is based on the 1963 novel Guns in the Heather, by Lockhart Amerman.

The film was primarily shot on location in Ireland (St. Flannan's College in Ennis, Corkscrew Hill, Corofin and Kilfenora, County Clare feature) with additional scenes shot at Pinewood Studios near London, England.

Plot
Rich Evans (Kurt Russell), An American exchange student’s day at the Leinster School in Ireland is interrupted when a bleeding man drives up to the school and gives Rich a message for his brother Tom (Glenn Corbett), before dying. Rich and his friend Sean O’Connor (Patrick Dawson) are taken from the school by a man who claims to be from the American Embassy,  but who turns out to be an Eastern Bloc agent. Rich and Sean make a daring escape and eventually reach Tom, who is an American intelligence agent and not the Irish sales rep for an American steel company as Rich thought. Rich and Sean get off the flight to London Tom placed them on when they spot some of the enemy agents and find Tom in time to save him from other agents, who had grabbed him. They head to Boyne castle, where the message said vital info about an East Bloc defecting scientist was hidden. However Tom is locked up with the real Lord Boyne, while East Bloc agents replace Lord Boyne and his staff.  Rich finds the info, but when he calls the US embassy with it, the bad guys are listening in. The imprisoned group help Tom make an ingenious escape from the dungeon they’re locked into.  Using a dory and a glider they are able to intercept the East Bloc agents before they can grab the defecting scientist.

Cast
Glenn Corbett as Tom Evans
Alfred Burke as Kersner
Kurt Russell as Rich Evans
Patrick Dawson as Sean O'Connor
Patrick Barr as Lord Boyne
Hugh McDermott as Carleton
Patrick Westwood as Levick
Eddie Byrne as Bailey
Godfrey Quigley as Meister
Kevin Stoney as Enhardt
Shay Gorman as Headmaster
Niall Tóibín as Kettering
Ernst Walder as Vollos
Robert Bernal as Sgt. Clune
Vincent Dowling as Maston
John Horton as Stafford
J. G. Devlin as Muldoon
Nicola Davies as Kathleen
Gerry Alexander as Paddy
Eamon Morrissey as Hennessey
Declan Mulholland as Retchick
Mary Larkin as Mary
Paul Farrell as Groundskeeper

References

External links

1969 films
1960s adventure thriller films
1960s chase films
1960s mystery thriller films
1960s spy films
British adventure thriller films
British chase films
British mystery thriller films
Films about brothers
Films based on adventure novels
Films based on mystery novels
Films directed by Robert Butler
Films produced by Ron W. Miller
Films scored by Buddy Baker (composer)
Films set in Ireland
1969 directorial debut films
1960s English-language films
1960s British films